Hamish Milne (27 April 1939 – 12 February 2020) was an English pianist known for his advocacy of Nikolai Medtner.

Milne studied at Bishop Wordsworth's School in Salisbury and then at the Royal Academy of Music in London, where he taught, and later in Italy under Guido Agosti.

In the 1970s, Milne was the first pianist to offer a comprehensive survey of the piano music of Medtner since the composer made his own records.

He died on 12 February 2020, at the age of 80.

References

1939 births
2020 deaths
21st-century classical pianists
Academics of the Royal Academy of Music
Alumni of the Royal Academy of Music
British classical pianists
Male classical pianists
People educated at Bishop Wordsworth's School
People from Salisbury
Piano pedagogues
21st-century British male musicians